Edwin Seroussi (born 26 December 1952 in Montevideo) is an Israeli musicologist of Uruguayan origin. He is the Emanuel Alexandre Professor of Musicology, director of the Jewish Music Research Centre at the Hebrew University of Jerusalem and a visiting scholar in Jewish studies at Dartmouth College. He is the 2018 Israel Prize laureate in the field of Musicology.

Biography 

Edwin Seroussi was born in Montevideo, Uruguay. He immigrated to Israel in 1971 to study at the Department of Musicology of the Hebrew University at the undergraduate and graduate levels continuing into his doctoral studies at the Department of Music (today the UCLA Herb Alpert School of Music of the University of California Los Angeles (1981-1987). Upon graduation he taught at Bar-Ilan University (1988-2000), transferring in 2000 to the Hebrew University.

He founded and edits Yuval Music Series and is editor of the CD series Anthology of Music Traditions in Israel of the Jewish Music Research Centre.

Areas of Research and Publications 

Seroussi's earliest publications explored diverse aspects of the history and consolidation of Sephardic liturgical music (see for example: Spanish-Portuguese Synagogue Music in Reform Sources from Hamburg, Jerusalem, 1996). At the same time, he started to explore the Judaeo-Spanish song repertoire, leading an international team in the editing of the Cancionero sefardi (1995) by Alberto Hemsi, one of the largest field collections of Sephardic songs from the pre-World War II period. Another line of historical research into the same repertoire led to the publication of Incipitario sefardi with the collaboration of Rivka Havassy. This volume records all the songs in Judaeo-Spanish mentioned as melody clues in collections of Hebrew sacred poetry in manuscript and printed.

Later on he turned his attention to popular music in Israel. Results of this research appeared in the book that he co-authored with sociologist of culture Motti Regev, Popular Music and National Culture in Israel.

Digital Humanities 

Seroussi initiated the development of an innovative online platform, Jewish Cultures Mapped, in collaboration with computer scientist and vocal performing artist Dr. Josef Sprinzak and web graphic designer, researcher, educator and media activist Mushon Zer-Aviv (aka Shu'al). Launched by the research project Da'at Hamakom in 2017 and under the care of the Jewish Music Research Centre  since late 2019, this unique interactive web-based map is based on innovative digital-mapping and information visualization technologies designed to explore and experience Jewish cultures in their historical development from a perspective of time and space. The map offers easy accessibility of high quality content to a wide range of publics, such as university researchers, school teachers, students and lay persons searching for information in a platform that differs from extant searching and data mining engines.

See also

Music of Israel

References

External links
Edwin Seroussi at Academia.edu
"Change and Continuity in the Singing of Baqqashot among Moroccan Jews in Israel: Transformations in the Symbolic Meaning of a Traditional Music Custom". Pe'amim 19 (1984), 113-129. [In Hebrew]
"The Tradition of singing of the Maftirim in Turkey".
"On the Beginnings of the Singing of Bakkashot in 19th- century Jerusalem". Pe'amim 56 (1996), 106-124. [In Hebrew] 
"Songs That Young Gershom Scholem May Have Heard: Jacob Beimel's Jüdische Melodieen, Jung Juda, and Jewish Musical Predicaments in Early Twentieth-Century Berlin".
 

1952 births
Living people
Jewish Israeli musicians
People from Montevideo
Jewish musicologists
Israeli musicologists
Israeli music educators
Israeli people of Uruguayan-Jewish descent
Uruguayan emigrants to Israel
Uruguayan Sephardi Jews
Academic staff of the Hebrew University of Jerusalem
20th-century Israeli educators
20th-century Israeli male musicians
21st-century Israeli educators
21st-century Israeli male musicians